Profsoyuznaya (. English: Trade Union's) is a station on the Kaluzhsko-Rizhskaya Line of the Moscow Metro. Opened in 1962.

Name
It is named after Profsoyuznaya Street (Trade Union street).

Design
Profsoyuznaya is built to a standard column tri-span and features pillars faced (except for very thin unfinished strips at the top and bottom) with gray marble.  The walls are finished with a diamond pattern made up of 4×4 squares of white ceramic tile (similar to argyle patterns, albeit simplified with use of single color).  The architects responsible for the station were Nina Aleshina and N. Demchinsky.

The two underground vestibules are located on Profsoyuznaya Street, at its intersection with Nakhimovsky Avenue known as Josip Broz Tito Square.

Moscow Metro stations
Railway stations in Russia opened in 1962
Kaluzhsko-Rizhskaya Line
Railway stations located underground in Russia